The Lotus Emira is a sports car manufactured by British automobile manufacturer Lotus Cars. It is intended to be the firm's final vehicle powered by an internal combustion engine.

History

The Emira was launched at Hethel, England on 6th July 2021 and then presented at the Goodwood Festival of Speed on 8th July 2021. It will replace the Evora, Exige and Elise. Following its debut, the Hethel-based company revealed the GT4 race car equivalent, which will make its track debut in 2022, replacing the older Evora GT4. Emira's design bears several similarities to that of Lotus' high-performance car Evija, which was presented in 2019.

It was confirmed that the new Emira will go on sale in March 2022 and will come with a 3.5 litre supercharged V6 sourced by Toyota. Available in either 6-speed manual or a 6-speed automatic.

Pricing was announced on 20 September 2021 for the UK, starting at £59,995 for the base i4 and £75,995 including 20% VAT tax for the V6 First Edition. US pricing was announced on 1 October 2021 starting at $74,900 for the base i4 and $93,900 for the V6 First Edition. The V6 First Edition was expected to have been available by Spring 2022 with the i4 following in Autumn 2022.

In 2022, the Emira made its debut in Malaysia with the First Edition being the variant on offer. It will be powered by the 3.5 litre supercharged V6.

Global post-pandemic supply chain issues meant that the factory was unable to get to full production capacity during 2022. The first EU and UK V6 manual variants (including some UK dealer demonstrator V6 cars) were delivered to customers in Q4 2022. Plans for 2023 include the first V6 automatic deliveries for the EU and UK in Q1, and US V6 deliveries starting in Q2. i4 variant production for the UK is now planned to start in Q3.

References

External links
Lotus Emira official web site

Emira
Sports cars
Cars introduced in 2021
Rear mid-engine, rear-wheel-drive vehicles
Coupés